Alex Fiva (born 29 January 1986) is a Swiss freestyle skier who specializes in the ski cross discipline.

Career
He started his career as an alpine skier who had some success as a junior. In 2006 he was the Swiss Junior Bronze medalist in the slalom discipline; however, he quit alpine skiing in 2007.

Having switched to freestyle ski cross, he made his World Cup debut in March 2008 in Meiringen, with a 29th place. However, it wasn't until early 2010 that he showed his potential, winning back-to-back Europa Cup races. These results earned him a place in the Swiss World Cup squad for the end of the season, his best result being 12th place in Grindelwald.

At the start of the 2010–2011 season, he took another step forward. In the second World Cup event of the season in Innichen, he came from nowhere to secure 2nd place, having been 35th the day before. He followed this up with two more top 5 finishes. He was chosen to represent Switzerland at the FIS Freestyle World Ski Championships 2011 in Deer Valley Resort. He only managed 25th place. In the next World Cup event, he sustained an injury which kept him out for the rest of the season.

It was in the 2011–2012 season that his real breakthrough came. He again finished on the podium in Innichen in the second World Cup event of the year, coming in third. He won his first World Cup in the night event in St. Johann in Tirol, and his second win came in the next week in Les Contamines.

References

External links
 

1986 births
Living people
Swiss male freestyle skiers
Freestyle skiers at the 2014 Winter Olympics
Freestyle skiers at the 2018 Winter Olympics
Freestyle skiers at the 2022 Winter Olympics
Olympic freestyle skiers of Switzerland
X Games athletes
Sportspeople from Newport Beach, California
Medalists at the 2022 Winter Olympics
Olympic silver medalists for Switzerland
Olympic medalists in freestyle skiing